Ken Roczen (born 29 April 1994 in Mattstedt, Germany) is a German professional motocross and supercross racer. He competed in the Motocross World Championships from 2009 to 2011 and has competed in the AMA Motocross Championships from 2012 to 2023. He is an MX2-class Motocross World Champion, Motocross des Nations winner, 250-class west Supercross champion, 450-class Monster Energy cup winner, and two-time 450-class US Motocross champion.

Professional career

Roczen was a member of the winning German team at the 2012 Motocross des Nations event that included Max Nagl and Marcus Schiffer. Their victory marked the first German win in the history of the Motocross des Nations.

US career
In 2013, Roczen won the Supercross 250 West Championship, ending the season 2 points ahead of Eli Tomac.

In 2014, he moved up to the 450cc class, joining Red Bull KTM Racing. Ken shocked fans worldwide when he started off his rookie season with a win in his first-ever 450 Supercross race at Anaheim I, the season opener. He would also go on to win at round 5 in Atlanta's Georgia Dome. Roczen finished the series 3rd in the points standings after the final race at Las Vegas. By finishing 3rd overall in the Supercross points chase his first year on the 450, Ken showed that he was primed to become one of the sports top competitors. Roczen would cement his new position atop the 450 Motocross world by going on to win the 2014 AMA Motocross Championship his rookie year, defeating Ryan Dungey.

In 2015, Roczen signed with RCH Suzuki. He failed to repeat as Pro Motocross champion for 2015, surrendering his #1 plate to Ryan Dungey. He would go on to win the 450-class Monster Energy cup.

In 2016, the German was runner-up in the AMA Supercross Championship points standings with five wins. He would go on to win the AMA Motocross title for the second time in dominating fashion with 20 wins.

In 2017, Roczen joined the Honda factory racing HRC Honda Racing Corporation team. After just winning his second Motocross championship he was favored to win the AMA Supercross Championship after finishing 2nd in 2016. Kenny would go on to win the first two races of the 2017 season. Then on 21 Jan 2017, while running in 3rd place Roczen's foot slipped off of the footpeg while going over a triple and he was ejected from the bike in mid-air crashing hard and receiving a compound fracture to his left arm, after landing face-first in a rhythm section of the track. Roczen would go on to miss the rest of the 2017 Supercross season and the following Motocross championship as well as he had sustained serious injuries to his left arm including a compound fracture and compartment syndrome.

In 2018, with his injury woes a year behind him, Roczen started the AMA Supercross Championship season in shape and ready to start his rise back to the top of the sport. He made it through much of the year, building on his progress each week and looking like he was rounding into form. Unfortunately on 10 February 2018, in San Diego, Roczen suffered another serious crash while attempting to pass Cooper Webb. As he entered a turn to set up a pass on Cooper with his back wheel spinning, he suddenly hooked a rut catching too much traction while also simultaneously impacting Cooper Webb's bike which caused him to fall off the back of the bike with his arm ending up being pulled into Cooper Webb's rear wheel and then shot back out. He underwent surgery to repair the shattered bones, dislocation of the metacarpals, and torn ligaments in his right hand. Roczen was out again for the rest of the Supercross season due to another serious injury. Luckily this gave Ken more time to allow his left arm to heal which was still damaged from the previous years crash. Roczen was able to heal just in time for the 2018 Motocross Championship in which he finished 3rd.

In 2019, he finished 4th in the Supercross Championship with four podiums (no wins). In the Motocross Championship, he won the opener in Hangtown and two more rounds, a total of 7 podiums of the 12 rounds, finishing 2nd in the final point standings. He attended RedBull Straight Rhythm, taking away a victory in the 250cc class despite it being his first time racing a two-stroke in his pro career.

In 2020, on 11 January, Ken Roczen won his first AMA Supercross race in three years with a win at St.Louis. He won two more rounds until the season was COVID-19 interrupted after round 10 in Daytona, 7 March, and was at this point trailing leader Eli Tomac by three points. The season resumed with seven rounds all in Salt Lake City, UT, between 31 May and 21 June racing Sundays and Wednesdays in Rice-Eccles Stadium without spectators. Of the seven rounds, Ken collected one more win but fell to 3rd in the final standings.

In the middle of the 2022, Roczen decided to stop and take a break for the rest of the AMA Supercross season due to mental health reasons after a difficult start to the year. However, he instead joined the new Supercross World Championship which he would win for Honda.

Roczen returned to Suzuki as a factory rider for the 2023 AMA Supercross season. His first win for the HEP Suzuki team would arrive at round 9, Indianapolis.

AMA Supercross/Motocross/MXGP results

Major titles 

 2007 – Junior World Champion 85ccm
 2009 – German ADAC MX Masters Champion
 2010 – German ADAC MX Masters Champion
 2011 – Motocross World Champion MX2
 2012 – 1st place at Motocross des Nations (MxoN) in Lommel (Belgium)
 2013 – AMA Supercross West Champion 250SX
 2014 – AMA Motocross Champion 450 class
 2015 – Monster Energy Cup winner
 2016 – AMA Motocross Champion 450 class
 2019 - Redbull Straight Rhythm 250cc winner 
 2022 WSX champion

Notes

References 

1994 births
Living people
People from Weimarer Land
German motocross riders
AMA Motocross Championship National Champions
Sportspeople from Thuringia